The Great Western Railway 4900 Class or Hall Class is a class of 4-6-0 mixed-traffic steam locomotives designed by Charles Collett for the Great Western Railway. A total of 259 were built at Swindon Works, numbered 4900–4999, 5900–5999 and 6900–6958. The LMS Stanier Class 5 4-6-0 and LNER Thompson Class B1 both drew heavily on design features of the Hall Class. After nationalisation in 1948, British Railways gave them the power classification 5MT.

Background 
By the end of 1923 the Great Western Railway (GWR) was well served with express passenger locomotives of the Saint and Star classes and had recently introduced the Castle Class. However, the mixed-traffic 2-6-0 locomotives of the 4300 Class were beginning to struggle with the increasing loads. George Jackson Churchward had recognised this with the introduction of the 4700 class 2-8-0 with  driving wheels, intended for express goods and relief passenger trains. However, Charles Collett preferred the idea of a Saint Class with smaller wheels to undertake these duties as this would provide a leading bogie. He therefore rebuilt number 2925 Saint Martin with  driving wheels.

Prototype
The prototype of the new class was rebuilt in 1924 and the cylinders were realigned in relation to the driving axle and a more modern 'Castle'-type cab was fitted. Saint Martin emerged from Swindon Works in 1924 and embarked on three years of trials. During this period Collett introduced other modifications such as changing the pitch of the taper boiler and adding outside steam pipes.

Production
After extensive trials during 1925–1927, Collett was satisfied with the performance of his prototype, subject to minor amendments and placed an order for eighty more with Swindon works (Lot 254) in 1928. The prototype was renumbered 4900 in December 1928 and the new locomotives were numbered 4901-80 and appeared at regular intervals until February 1930. They were named after English and Welsh country houses with 'Hall' in their titles and so became known as the 'Hall Class'.

The original locomotives were built with Churchward  tenders but after 4958 Collett's larger  types became standard although a few later locomotives were fitted with smaller tenders if these were available as they entered service.

The first fourteen examples were despatched to the arduous proving grounds of the Cornish Main Line. They were so successful here and elsewhere on the GWR system that by the time the first production batch had been completed a further twenty were on order (Lot 268, 4981–99 and 5900). Further orders followed throughout the 1930s and early 1940s. By 1935, 150 were in service and the 259th and last Hall, No. 6958 Oxburgh Hall, was delivered in 1943. Thereafter further deliveries were of the '6959 Modified Hall' class.

Oil firing
Eleven Hall class locomotives were converted to oil-firing in the period 1946–1950. While in this condition they were renumbered into the 3900 series. When the oil-firing was removed, they reverted to their old numbers.

Performance
As indicated by their continuing production, the Hall class proved to be very successful in a variety of different roles from goods work to passenger services, although barred from several cross-country and branch lines because of their red weight classification. According to Peter Herring, 'they were the first true mixed traffic locomotives, and as such precursors of the Stanier 'Black Five', Thompson B1 and BR Standard 5MT 4-6-0.' (However, while they were forerunners of these highly successful and numerous 4-6-0 types, there were several successful 2-6-0 and 4-6-0 ‘mixed traffic’ types on the GWR and other British railways before them, - not least the GWR 4300 Class they were designed to replace.)

Modified Hall Class

Although the GWR had been at the forefront of British locomotive development between 1900 and 1930, the 1930s saw a degree of complacency at Swindon reflected in the fact that the design had largely originated in the 1900s and had not fundamentally changed since the mid-1920s. Collett was replaced by Frederick Hawksworth in 1941 who created a modified version of the design, known as the Modified Hall Class. These continued to be produced by British Railways until 1950, by which time there were a further seventy-one locomotives.

Accidents and incidents
On 30 April 1941, 4911 Bowden Hall took a direct hit during a bombing raid on the Keyham area of Plymouth and was later broken up. The locomotive had stopped at a signal box because of an air raid, and the crew survived by sheltering under the steps of the signal box. 4911 was one of two GWR locomotives damaged beyond repair in Britain during World War II, the other was GWR 1854 Class No. 1729. 4936 Kinlet Hall, ran into a bomb crater in that area and was severely damaged, but was repaired.
Three people were killed and two were injured.
On 25 August 1962, a passenger train stopped at Torquay, due to the failure of the locomotive hauling it. 4932 Hatherton Hall was hauling a passenger train that overran signals and was in a rear-end collision with it. Twenty-three people were injured.

Withdrawal
All but one of the original Collett Halls survived until nationalisation in 1948, the exception being 4911 Bowden Hall. Withdrawals began in 1959 with the prototype Saint Martin. Its accumulated mileage, both in its original form and rebuilt form, was a remarkable 2,092,500 miles. Further withdrawals of the production series took place during the 1960s and the class was extinct by 1965.

Preservation

By 1965 the last Hall had been withdrawn from the Western Region without a single one entering the National Collection. Eleven examples of the Hall class have survived to preservation with all being rescued from Barry Island Scrapyard, seven of which have run in preservation. The first member of the class to be rescued from Barry Scrapyard was 4965 Rood Ashton Hall being rescued in Oct 1970 leaving as the 10th departure, the engine was at this point originally assumed to be 4983 Albert Hall as parts on the engine were stamped 4983 but was later discovered during its restoration to be 4965. The last original hall to be rescued from Barry Scrapyard was 5967 Bickmarsh Hall being rescued in Aug 1987 leaving as the 187th departure.

Of the engines which haven't yet operated in preservation, 4942 Maindy Hall has been "regressed" back to a GWR Saint Class, 4979 Wootton Hall is undergoing restoration at the Ribble Steam Railway with work currently focusing on the engine's tender, 5952 Cogan Hall is under cosmetic restoration at Tyseley Locomotive Works with a small number of parts being used in the construction of 6880 Betton Grange and 5967 Bickmarsh Hall is undergoing restoration at the Northampton & Lamport Railway.

Of the remaining seven Halls which have run in preservation, all six of the UK-based engines have been operated on the main line: 4930 Hagley Hall, 4936 Kinlet Hall, 4953 Pitchford Hall, 4965 Rood Ashton Hall, 5900 Hinderton Hall and 5972 Olton Hall. 5972 Olton Hall has gained fame as the locomotive used in the Harry Potter film series. 4920 Dumbleton Hall has operated previously in preservation but is now on static display in Japan as part of the new Harry Potter attraction in Tokyo which opens in 2023.

As of September 2022 two halls are operational but neither are mainline certified. 4936 Kinlet Hall is undergoing a Network Rail standard overhaul at Tyseley Locomotive Works.

See also 
 List of GWR standard classes with two outside cylinders

References

External links 

Great Western archives - Hall class
Friends of Locomotive 4930 Hagley Hall
4936 Kinlet Hall Group
The Furness Railway Trust's Wooton Hall webpage

 
4900
4-6-0 locomotives
Railway locomotives introduced in 1928
Standard gauge steam locomotives of Great Britain
2′C h2 locomotives